There are several groups named Confederación General de Trabajadores:

Confederación General de Trabajadores (Mexico)
Confederación General de Trabajadores (Peru)
Confederación General de Trabajadores (Puerto Rico)